The 1964–65 NHL season was the 48th season of the National Hockey League. Six teams each played 70 games. Jean Beliveau was the winner of the newly introduced Conn Smythe Trophy as the most valuable player during the playoffs. The Montreal Canadiens won their first Stanley Cup since 1960 as they were victorious over the Chicago Black Hawks in a seven-game final series.

League business
The Canadian Amateur Hockey Association (CAHA) wanted to end the NHL's system of sponsoring junior ice hockey teams and replace it with an NHL Amateur Draft of players who had graduated from junior hockey. The CAHA felt that the current system concentrated talent on a small number of teams and sought for the NHL to spread out that money it invested equally among the junior leagues and branches in Canada. CAHA president Lionel Fleury wanted a junior-aged player to complete an education, rather than be encouraged to quit schooling to focus on playing hockey. In December 1964, he presented the CAHA's proposal to the NHL for a new draft system which would allow players remain in junior hockey until age 20 instead of the NHL obtaining the player's rights at age 18. Discussions remained unresolved until a new agreement with the requested changes was reached in August 1966.

Regular season
Important new additions by Chicago were Bobby Hull's brother Dennis Hull and defenceman Doug Jarrett, and they traded Reg Fleming, Ab McDonald and Murray Balfour to Boston in exchange for Doug Mohns.

Frank Selke had retired as general manager of the Montreal Canadiens, and a man who was showing all the signs of being more capable than Selke, Sam Pollock, took over as general manager. Pollock had been doing an outstanding job as director of the Canadiens farm system the past few seasons and the Habs were deep in talent.

Ted Lindsay decided to make a comeback with Detroit and though Toronto beat Detroit in the opener 5–3, the Olympia fans gave him an ovation.

This was the first season the Conn Smythe Trophy was awarded for the most valuable player in the Stanley Cup playoffs.

Muzz Patrick resigned as general manager of the New York Rangers and Emile Francis, assistant general manager, took his place. On January 27, 1965, Ulf Sterner, the first European trained player, made his debut in the National Hockey League for the New York Rangers in a game versus the Boston Bruins.

Ron Ellis was proving to be a find and he scored two goals when the Leafs downed Chicago 5–1 on October 31.

Frank Mahovlich entered a hospital for psychiatric treatment under great stress from fans and his manager Punch Imlach who expected more of him than he was delivering. He could not stand the pressure of playing.

After stopping a shot with his foot, Marcel Pronovost missed a few games and Detroit sorely missed him, as on December 5, Toronto clobbered the Red Wings 10–2. Bob Pulford was clipped by Gordie Howe's club when it was knocked upward and it hit Pulford in the eye.

Frank Mahovlich was back on December 9 when Montreal downed Toronto 3–2. Three nights later, he had two goals and two assists when Toronto beat Boston 6–3.

Chicago defeated Boston 7–5 on December 16 and Bobby Hull got two goals. He now had 25 goals in 26 games. The Black Hawks were now alternating Glenn Hall and Denis DeJordy in goal.

On December 22, Montreal traded Bill Hicke and Jean-Guy Morissette to New York in exchange for Dick Duff and Dave McComb.

On December 26, Bill Thoms, who played 12 years with Toronto and Chicago, died of a heart attack, aged 54.

Toronto's Punch Imlach ruled with an iron hand and was really upset with the Leafs play. Wholesale demotions were threatened if the team's play did not improve. Toronto snapped out of its decline when they beat Detroit 3–1 on January 2. Tim Horton scored two goals playing as a forward instead of his usual defence position. Roger Crozier was struck in the eye by Jim Pappin's stick late in the game and was replaced by Carl Wetzel in goal. Ted Lindsay got into a heated argument with referee Vern Buffey over whether a penalty should be called against Pappin and received a ten-minute misconduct penalty and a game misconduct. Lindsay stated to the press after the game that his advice to coach Sid Abel was not to pay the fines and that he would not sit still for NHL president Clarence Campbell's kangaroo court. All this was reported to Campbell who said Lindsay would pay the fines or not play. In due course, an appropriate signed apology and a cheque in the amount of the fines were handed over by Lindsay and he was reinstated January 6.

Bill Hicke, who had been traded to the Rangers by the Canadiens, turned on his ex-teammates with a hat trick at the Montreal Forum on January 9 as the Rangers won 6–5. However, the Rangers lost defenceman Jim Neilson with a shoulder separation. The Rangers got walloped by the Leafs 6–0 the next night as Tim Horton had two goals. Despite the win, the fans were still chanting "We want Shack!" (meaning Eddie Shack).

George Hayes, who had been an official in the NHL for 19 years, was suspended for refusing to take an eye test. Later, he had his contract terminated when he still refused. Referee-in-chief Carl Voss announced his intention to resign at the end of the season, and Hayes and ex-referee Eddie Powers greeted this with approval.

Chicago moved into first place with a 4–1 win on February 3 over the New York Rangers right at Madison Square Garden. Bobby Hull did not score, but the highlight of the game was his fight with Bob Plager.

Chicago beat Toronto 6–3 on February 6 and Bobby Hull's chances of reaching 50 goals was in trouble when he was checked heavily by Bobby Baun, and he limped from the ice with strained knee ligaments. On the same weekend, Detroit moved into first place, beating Montreal twice.

The Leafs pulled into a tie with Montreal for second place when they pasted Montreal 6–2 in Toronto on February 10. This was the fifth straight loss for the Habs. Referee Bill Friday had a busy time with a bench-clearing brawl that delayed the game for 20 minutes. The trouble began when John Ferguson hooked Frank Mahovlich. Terry Harper, Ted Harris, Pete Stemkowski and Kent Douglas moved in and then the benches emptied. Referee Friday assessed 66 minutes in penalties, including ten minute misconducts to Mahovlich and Ted Harris. President Campbell later assessed $925 in fines. Ten Leafs were fined $50 each and six Canadiens players were fined $50.

Red Kelly had the hat trick on March 21 when Toronto pummeled the Rangers 10–1.

The Rangers beat the Black Hawks on March 23 3–2. A great many fans were upset at plans for a closed circuit telecast of Chicago games and during the game there were shouts of "Norris is a fink!" (referring to James D. Norris, part owner of the Black Hawks).

Detroit finished first for the first time since 1956–57 when they beat the Rangers 7–4 on March 25. Alex Delvecchio had the hat trick and Norm Ullman scored two goals.

Final standings

Playoffs
The NHL required all teams to carry two goaltenders for the playoffs.

Playoff bracket

Semifinals

For the third straight year, it was Montreal vs. Toronto and Detroit vs. Chicago in the first round. The Canadiens came out on top over the defending champion Leafs in six games, while the Hawks beat the Wings in seven.

(1) Detroit Red Wings vs. (3) Chicago Black Hawks

(2) Montreal Canadiens vs. (4) Toronto Maple Leafs

Stanley Cup Finals

In the Finals, the Canadiens defeated the Black Hawks in seven games.

Awards
The NHL changed its criteria for the Vezina Trophy, allowing multiple goaltenders to be named the winner of the trophy. Johnny Bower and Terry Sawchuk of the Maple Leafs were named the winners. Neither made the all-star team. Pierre Pilote won the Norris Trophy for the third consecutive year. Stan Mikita won the Art Ross trophy (scoring champion) for the second consecutive year. Bobby Hull won the Hart Trophy as most valuable player for the first time, and the Lady Byng. Roger Crozier won the Calder for best first-year player, and was named the First All-Star team goaltender.

All-Star teams

Player statistics

Scoring leaders
Note: GP = Games played, G = Goals, A = Assists, PTS = Points, PIM = Penalties in minutes

Source: NHL.

Leading goaltenders

Note: GP = Games played; Min – Minutes played; GA = Goals against; GAA = Goals against average; W = Wins; L = Losses; T = Ties; SO = Shutouts

Coaches
Boston Bruins: Milt Schmidt
Chicago Black Hawks: Billy Reay
Detroit Red Wings: Sid Abel
Montreal Canadiens: Toe Blake
New York Rangers: Red Sullivan
Toronto Maple Leafs: Punch Imlach

Debuts
The following is a list of players of note who played their first NHL game in 1964–65 (listed with their first team, asterisk(*) marks debut in playoffs):
Joe Watson, Boston Bruins
Bill Goldsworthy, Boston Bruins
Wayne Cashman, Boston Bruins
Dennis Hull, Chicago Black Hawks
Ken Hodge, Chicago Black Hawks
Bob Plager, New York Rangers
Brit Selby, Toronto Maple Leafs

Last games
The following is a list of players of note that played their last game in the NHL in 1964–65 (listed with their last team):
Tom Johnson, Boston Bruins
Ted Lindsay, Detroit Red Wings

See also 
 1964-65 NHL transactions
 List of Stanley Cup champions
 1964 NHL Amateur Draft
 National Hockey League All-Star Game
 1964 in sports
 1965 in sports

Citations

References

External links
 Hockey Database
 NHL.com

 
1
1